Neolithic Dwellings Museum in Stara Zagora, Bulgaria  is a museum in Stara Zagora, Bulgaria, which contains ruins of two of the oldest surviving buildings in the world.

The Neolithic Dwellings Museum in Stara Zagora, Bulgaria was created in 1979. It is a branch of The Stara Zagora Regional Historical Museum.
The Neolithic Dwellings Museum is built around two Neolithic houses dating back to the 6th millennium BC. 1826 artifacts were found there. The Neolithic dwellings are the best-preserved in Europe from this period. Kitchens, fireplaces, hand grain mills, and ceramic vessels comprise the richest inventory of 6th millennium BC prehistoric house life in Europe. The prehistoric art exhibition displays 333 of the most important finds from the Neolithic and Chalcolithic periods (6th millennium BC – 3rd millennium BC).

See also
List of the oldest buildings in the world
Old Europe (archaeology)

References

External links
Neolithic Dwellings museum in Stara Zagora, Bulgaria - an 8000 year-old story

Museums established in 1979
Archaeological museums in Bulgaria
Buildings and structures in Stara Zagora
Museums in Stara Zagora Province
1979 establishments in Bulgaria
Tourist attractions in Stara Zagora
Education in Stara Zagora